The Texas tortoise (Gopherus berlandieri), is a species of tortoise in the family Testudinidae. The species G. berlandieri is one of six species of tortoises that are native to North America.

Geographic range
G. berlandieri is found from southern Texas southward into the Mexican states of Coahuila, Nuevo León, and Tamaulipas.

Etymology
The specific epithet, berlandieri, is in honor of naturalist Jean Louis Berlandier, who worked for the Mexican government on one of the first biological surveys of Texas. As such, some sources refer to it as Berlandier's tortoise.

Biology
The Texas tortoise, unlike other species of gopher tortoise, is not an adept burrower. Its preferred habitat is dry scrub and grasslands. Succulent plants, a preferred food of the Texas tortoise, are common in these areas. It especially likes the fruit of cacti such as the prickly pear.

Conservation status
Though considered an animal of low concern by the IUCN Red List, the Texas tortoise is listed as a threatened species in the state of Texas, and thus protected by state law. It is illegal to collect or possess them.  The Mexican federal government list Gopherus berlandieri as A (= Threatened) in Mexico. Likewise, using Environmental Vulnerability Scores, Gopherus berlandieri scored 18, a high  vulnerability species on a scale of 0-20, in evaluations of both Tamaulipas and Nuevo Leon herpetofauna. In 2018, the IUCN Tortoise and Freshwater Turtle Specialist Group recommended a re-assessment and re-classification of all six Gopherus species This reclassification would move  G. berlandieri from Near Endangered (NE) to Near Threatened (NT).

Gallery

References

External links

Texas tortoise
Texas tortoise care sheet

Gopherus
Tortoise, Texas
Tortoise, Texas
Tortoise, Texas
Reptiles described in 1857